The Géo Gras Group was a French resistance movement that played a decisive role during Operation Torch, the British-American invasion of French North Africa during WWII.
Formed October 1940 in Algiers, the group recruited Jews and French Army officers opposed to the Vichy regime.  They provided a third of the resistance fighters during the capture of Algiers. Its role was to neutralize the strategic civilian and military points of the city, and prevent the Vichy forces from defeating the Allied forces.

Origin and operation
The abolishment of the Marchandeau Decree on August 16, 1940 allowed the ultra right French Popular Party lead by Jacques Doriot to maintain anti-Semitic unrest in Algiers. The windows of Jewish-owned stores were smashed during the night of September 11, 1940.
On October 7, 1940 the Crémieux Decree, a law that gave French citizenship to Algerian Jews, was abolished by the Vichy regime. 120,000 Algerian Jews were stripped of their French citizenship and were from then on considered "indigenous Israelites". This discriminatory status excluded them from major public office, the military, and professions in the media, cinema, radio, and theater. 
LICA members, André Temime and Emile Atlan, together with Charles Bouchara and Paul Sebaoun, formed a resistance group in favor of the Allied cause. The group gathered in a gym on Government Square (now Martyrs Square) in Algiers. There they trained with Géo Gras, a former French military boxing champion, and practiced a range of fighting techniques such as boxing, fencing, and judo. Unbeknownst to Géo Gras, weapons were hidden under the ring and beneath the floorboards of the room. He was unaware of his students' resistance activities.
The organization was structured on a French military model. Half-companies consisting of sixty members divided into thirty member platoons and five member fireteams. Among its leaders were Fernand Aïch, Roger Albou, Émile Atlan, Charles Bouchara, Jean Gamzon, Jean Gozlan, André Levy, Germain Libine (future special guard of General De Gaulle), George Loufrani, Roger Morali, André Temime, and general counsel Raphaël Aboulker, cousin of José Aboulker.
Reserve officers Lieutenant Jean Dreyfus, Lieutenant Fernand Fredj, Lieutenant Roger Jais, officer aspirant Jacques Zermati and industrialist Roger Carcassonne from Oran joined the organization. The first actions were focused on the anti-Vichy propaganda, recruitment, and the purchase of smuggled weapons. An initial stock of weapons came from the store of Emile Atlan, gunsmith by trade, until the enactment of anti-Semitic laws.

On March 27, 1941 French Army Chief of Staff, General Picquendar signed circulars stipulating the internment of Jewish soldiers from Algeria, especially in the internment camps of Bedeau, Télergma, Chéragas, Djenien Bourezg, Mécheria, and El Meridj. On June 2, 1941, a law required a census of all Jews in Algeria. The words "indigenous Israelites” were added to their identity cards. On August 23, 1941, a quota on Jewish students excluded two thirds of them from study. A decree dated November 5, 1941 established a quota of 2% for lawyers and medical professions. Professions such as broker, banker, realtor, forester, midwife, and architect were prohibited. The economic aryanisation of Jewish property was established by a decree of November 21, 1941.

November 8, 1942

On October 22, 1942, General Clark, secretly came to Cherchell, Algeria to negotiate the coordination of the military operations for the Allied forces for the invasion of North Africa with the representatives of the Resistance. The two focal points of this clandestine negotiation were :
 On D-Day, the Resistance shall control the strategic points of the city; cut the Vichy means of communication; neutralize the 19th Army Corps and the police forces until the arrival of the Allied Army; and capture military and civilian leaders under the Vichy authority.
 US Special Forces would be sent before the landing of regular troops to take over the positions captured by the Resistance who were out-numbered by the Vichy armed forces.

On November 7, 1942, the BBC broadcast the code message: "Hello Robert? Franklin’s coming!" (Robert refers to American Consul Robert Murphy, personal representative of Franklin Roosevelt in French North Africa). Under the command of General Eisenhower, 110,000 men were engaged in Operation Torch. The invasion took place on the night of November 7 without having notified General de Gaulle. Colonel Germain Jousse and General Charles Mast led the resistance operation. Supplies of arms by the Allies had failed, so very old Lebel Model 1886 rifles, stolen from the military by Colonel Jousse, were distributed to resistance fighters. The fighters were identified by VP armbands (Square Volunteers). These armbands were originally intended to identify collaborationist volunteers. 
Called for 21:00 hours with mission orders signed by General Mast or Colonel Jousse, section leaders took up the main key targets of the city such as the barracks of 19th Army Corps, police stations, the arsenal, telephone exchanges, the General Government (also known as Summer Palace), the Prefecture, and the headquarters of Radio Algiers. All means of communication of Vichy forces were sabotaged. The operation was accomplished as early as 1:30.

The Allied invasion was however 15 hours behind schedule because of rough seas, communication failure with the Resistance, and the difficult first landing of the Anglo-American forces on the Western Front. The positions captured by the Resistance were recaptured by the Vichy forces. Resistant fighters tried to secure their positions as long as possible, resulting in the death of Lieutenant Jean Dreyfus, and Captain Alfred Pillafort. The US military released the city only in the late afternoon, with the surrender of Admiral François Darlan, commander of the French Forces.
General Juin ordered a ceasefire at 16:30. The future leader of the French Expeditionary Corps and future Marshal of France then commanded the Vichy French troops in North Africa.

Vichy internment camps and FLN assassinations
The action of the members of the Géo Gras Group was a victory of a lightly armed civilian force over the regular army. It represented the first major act of the French Resistance during the WWII. The Group identified itself as belonging to the Free French Forces, but was in effect isolated from Free France because of a lack of contact with General de Gaulle in London.
In the Algiers sector, there was virtually no armed opposition from the French troops to the US invasion, but the combat in Oran and in Morocco killed 1,350 people on the French side, 480 people among the Allies, and wounded 2,700 people among both camps.
The political situation in liberated French Africa was particularly intricate and unstable by the end of the operation. Darlan, the advocate of the Paris Protocols continued to exercise power in North Africa. The Americans considered this the least bad solution, on the basis of military expediency. Algiers went from "Vichy under German control to Vichy under US control". Despite the crucial participation of the Jewish community in the Allied invasion, Darlan refused to reinstate the Crémieux Decree and continued to declare that he governed "in the name of impeded Marshal Pétain."
On November 30, 1942, General Giraud gave the order to arrest and detain the key civilian fighters of the battle of November 8, 1942. Members of the Géo Gras Group such as Raphaël Aboulker, André Temime, Fernand Morali and Émile Atlan were arrested. In contrast, French soldiers who fought against the Americans were decorated. General Giraud succeeded Darlan, who was assassinated by Bonnier de la Chapelle on December 24, 1942, as commander-in-chief. With the approval of the British and Americans the collaborationist Marcel Peyrouton - the Interior Minister of the Vichy government, who had signed in October 1940 the abolition of Crémieux Decree - became the Governor General of Algeria on January 19, 1943 (the "Peyrouton scandal "). General Giraud repealed the Vichy anti-Jewish laws on March 14, 1943 and signed the official order to close the internment camps for Jewish soldiers on April 28, 1943. Nevertheless, he maintained the repeal of the Crémieux Decree.
General de Gaulle left London and moved to Algiers on May 30, 1943. The French Committee of National Liberation succeeded Free France on June 3, 1943 but it took 5 months to reinstate the emancipation decree of 1870. On October 22, 1943 the French citizenship was given back to the Jewish community of Algeria.
On November 8, 1943, on the occasion of the first anniversary of the invasion of North Africa, General Giraud decorated the main organizers and French participants in the operation, including Henri d'Astier de la Vigerie and Aboulker whom he had arrested a few months earlier .
An Association of the French liberation of November 8, 1942 - called Association of the Companions of November 8 - was created on September 21, 1943. This apolitical association organized under France's 1901 Association Act had the aim of "defending the collective interests of the North African Resistance" and "maintaining the spirit of camaraderie and confidence that existed in the Resistance." Some of its leading members were murdered by the FLN during targeted assassination in August–September 1956. Fernand Aïch and Emile Atlan were shot at close range in front of their shops. These killings were immediately interpreted as a collective threat to the Jewish community.

Further reading 
 “Operation Torch, the Algiers Insurrection and the Jewish role”, Jews, Citizenship, and Antisemitism in French colonial Algeria, 1870-1943, Sophie B. Roberts, University of Toronto,

Bibliography 
Jacques Cantier, L’Algérie sous le régime de Vichy, Odile Jacob, 2002

References 

French Resistance networks and movements
Conflicts in 1942
World War II invasions
Battles and operations of World War II
North African campaign
Military battles of Vichy France
Battles and operations of World War II involving France
Land battles and operations of World War II involving the United Kingdom
Naval battles and operations of World War II involving the United Kingdom
Invasions by the United States
Battles and operations of World War II involving the United Kingdom
November 1942 events